This was the first edition of the tournament.

Lauren Davis won the title after defeating Ann Li 7–5, 7–5 in the final.

Seeds

Draw

Finals

Top half

Bottom half

References

Main Draw

FineMark Women's Pro Tennis Championship - Singles